Telok Ayer Constituency was a constituency in Singapore. It existed from 1951 to 1988.

Member of Parliament

Elections

Elections in the 1950s

Historical maps

References

Singaporean electoral divisions
Raffles Place
Tanjong Pagar